David James Gow CBE (born 1957) is the inventor of the i-Limb prosthetic hand. He was made an honorary Doctor of Science in November 2018 by the University of Edinburgh.

Biography
He was born in Dumfries in 1957 and was educated at Breconbeds School, Kirtlebridge, Annan Academy and the University of Edinburgh. He studied Mechanical Engineering from 1975 to 1979, graduating with BSc (Honours) in Engineering Science. He then worked for a year at Ferranti (Scotland) a defence contractor in Edinburgh. In January 1981 he began a research post at the University of Edinburgh lasting until 1984 when he transferred to the National Health Service (NHS). He managed the Rehabilitation Technology Services for NHS Lothian and was based at the SMART Centre in Edinburgh.

Career
He began a programme of research activities in the field of upper limb prosthetics. In 1998 he fitted a fellow Scot, Campbell Aird with an electrical arm prosthesis containing the world's first electrical shoulder. In 2002 he founded and spun out the first company from the NHS, Touch EMAS Ltd and became its first CEO. He invented the i-limb and ProDigits partial hand system (later i-limb digits, now i-digits). He and his team from the company (which became Touch Bionics in 2005) won the MacRobert Award from the Royal Academy of Engineering in 2008.

He is a Chartered Engineer and a Fellow of the Institute of Physics and Engineering in Medicine and the Royal Academy of Engineering.

Gow was appointed Commander of the Order of the British Empire (CBE) in the 2014 Birthday Honours for services to upper limb prosthetics.

David retired from the NHS in April 2015.

Family

He is married to Janet Brunton.  His parents (both deceased) were James, and Effie (née Shankland), and he has an older sister Mary, and a younger brother, Iain. James, his father, served in the 2nd Battalion Royal Scots, and was captured by the Japanese in Hong Kong on Christmas Day 1941 - he was being transferred to Japan on the freighter Lisbon Maru when it was torpedoed and sank on the 2nd of October, 1942; he spent the remainder of the war in Japan, initially in Kobe House prisoner of war camp (Osaka #2).  David is the maternal nephew of the late David Shankland, MBE, a former nursing tutor and well-known after-dinner speaker and Burns' enthusiast.

References

External links
https://web.archive.org/web/20130120031346/http://www.myworldofwork.co.uk/content/i-invented-the-bionic-hand

1957 births
People from Dumfries
Scottish inventors
Alumni of the University of Edinburgh
Commanders of the Order of the British Empire
Living people